The North American Millers' Association is a non-profit trade association for the wheat, corn, oat, and rye milling industries. It comprises companies operating grain mills in the United States and Canada and the companies providing products and services to the mills.

The North American Millers' Association is headquartered in Washington, D.C. The Association was founded in April 1998, when the former Millers National Federation (wheat flour millers, established 1902), the American Corn Millers' Federation (corn dry millers, established 1918), and Protein Grain Products International (processors of grain products used in U.S. food aid programs) merged to become the North American Millers' Association. The American Oat Growers Association merged with the organization in 2000.

References

External links
 

Trade associations based in the United States
Food industry trade groups
Organizations based in Washington, D.C.